Mordellistena indistincta is a species of beetle in the family Mordellidae. It is in the genus Mordellistena. It was discovered in 1882, and is found in New York.

References

indistincta
Beetles described in 1882